Baburam Nishad  is an  Indian politician and a member of the Rajya Sabha, upper house of the Parliament of India from Uttar Pradesh as a member of the Bharatiya Janata Party.

Political background
Baburam Nishad is considered to be the grassroots leader of Bundelkhand Region, Former Chief Minister Kalyan Singh's government to  Government of Chief Minister Yogi Adityanath, worked in various positions in the party and government.  During a political program, Chief Minister Yogi Adityanath had praised him on the stage.
In 2018 Bauram Nishad Became State Minister / Former Chairman Uttar Pradesh Backward Classes Finance Development Corporation. BJP was made State Vice President, Uttar Pradesh In 2016. Hi became Regional Coordinator Kanpur - Bundelkhand, BJP. Regional President - Bundelkhand, Bharatiya Janata Party,  District President of Hamirpur-Uttar Pradesh Bharatiya Janata Party️ ,Former President - Uttar Pradesh Fisheries Cooperative Federation, Uttar Pradesh in Kalyan Singh Government. He started District President Yuva Morcha - Hamirpur, Uttar Pradesh Bharatiya Janata Party In 1992.

References

Bharatiya Janata Party politicians from Uttar Pradesh
Living people
Rajya Sabha members from Uttar Pradesh
1969 births